Quarry Bay is one of the 35 constituencies in the Eastern District, Hong Kong.

The constituency returns one district councillor to the Eastern District Council, with an election every four years. It was created for the first time in  1982 election and again in the 1994 election and current held by Eddie Ting Kong-ho of the Democratic Alliance for the Betterment and Progress of Hong Kong.

Quarry Bay constituency is loosely based on Quarry Bay with estimated population of 13,076.

Councillors represented

1982 to 1985

1994 to present

Election results

2010s

2000s

1990s

1980s

Notes

References

Quarry Bay
Constituencies of Hong Kong
Constituencies of Eastern District Council
1982 establishments in Hong Kong
Constituencies established in 1982
1994 establishments in Hong Kong
Constituencies established in 1994